Dug Days (also known as Up: Dug Days) is an American computer-animated streaming television series of shorts produced by Pixar Animation Studios for the Disney+ streaming service. The series is set immediately after the 2009 3D CGI film Up, following its main characters, dog Dug, voiced by Bob Peterson and his owner, 78-year-old Carl Fredricksen, voiced by Ed Asner in one of his last performances. It was created, written and directed by Peterson, and produced by Peterson and Kim Collins.

The series was announced in December 2020, during Disney's Investor Day, with Peterson pitched the series centering on Dug following his work on Forky Asks a Question. The animators created new animation rigging, textures, and hair for the characters in order to update their original designs due to advances in CG animation ever since the original film's release. Due to the COVID-19 pandemic in the United States, much of the final animations were done from the crew's homes, and the cast remotely recorded their dialogue.

Dug Days premiered with its episodes on September 1, 2021, on Disney+. It received generally positive reviews for its voice performance, message, role models, humor and emotional depth.

On December 19, 2022, it was announced that the show would get a special short titled "Carl's Date", originally set to stream on February 10, 2023,  but it has been delayed indefinitely.

Premise
The miniseries is set after the events of Up, and presents the adventures of Golden Retriever dog named Dug living with his owner, widower and childless 78-year-old Carl Fredricksen, in their new house in the suburb.

Voice cast
Bob Peterson as Dug
Ed Asner (via archival recordings) as Carl Fredricksen
Jordan Nagai (unused archival recordings) as Russell (episode "Science")
Neketia Henry as the Neighbor (episode "Puppies")
Simon Helberg as the Squirrel (episode "Science")
Jeff Pidgeon as the Fly (episode "Science")
Sarayu Blue as the Bluebird (episode "Science")
Heather Eisner as the Snail (episode "Science")
Moon Choe as Russell's mother (episode "Science")

Episodes

Production

Development
The series was announced on December 10, 2020, during Disney's Investor Day. It was produced by Pixar, with Bob Peterson as its creator, director, and writer. It premiered on Disney+ streaming service, with five episodes, on September 1, 2021. Peterson pitched the series following his work on Forky Asks a Question, as he wanted to revisit the characters from Up, and felt a short series centering on Dug was the appropriate format. Kim Collins joined as producer after Peterson wrote the series. Up director and Pixar chief creative officer Pete Docter was an executive-producer for the series; Docter supervised the series so it would be faithful to the original film.

Casting
In addition to writing and directing the series, Peterson reprises his role as Dug from the film. Ed Asner, Carl's voice actor from both the film and the series, died on August 29, three days before the series premiere, making it a posthumous performance and is dedicated in his memory. Unused archive recordings of Jordan Nagai as Russell were used in the episode "Science", as Nagai had already retired from acting by the time the series entered development.

Due to lockdowns product of the COVID-19 pandemic, the cast had to remotely record their dialogue.

Animation
Due to the COVID-19 pandemic, the series was animated remotely, with approximately 100 animators working on the series, a smaller number than usual for a Pixar production. All episodes were produced simultaneously. The series also had a tighter production schedule than most Pixar productions, due to being released on streaming.

For Carl's new home, animators created a design reminiscent of his old home while also being different. They also used similar design aesthetics for Carl's neighborhood. The animators also created new animation rigging, textures, and hair for the characters in order to update their original designs due to advances in CG animation ever since the original film's release. Carl's animation and movement was altered to reflect the events of the original film.

Music
The score for Dug Days was composed by Andrea Datzman and Curtis Green. Up composer and longtime Pixar collaborator Michael Giacchino was approached to return for the series, but declined due to scheduling issues, and instead recommended Andrea, who in turn contacted Curtis to help with the score. The score references Giacchino's work for the original film. According to producer Kim Collins, the score for each episode features different tones and themes. The score for the series was released in September 1, 2021.

Release
Dug Days premiered on September 1, 2021 on Disney+ and consists of five episodes.

Reception

Critical response 
Joel Keller of Decider found the humor of the series simple yet effective and praised the performances of the cast members, claimed that the interactions between the characters manage bring an emotional bond between them, while complimenting the animation. Joly Herman of Common Sense Media rated the series 4 out of 5 stars and complimented Dug Days for providing positive messages such as kindness and loyalty, while praising the depiction of diverse positive role models through the characters.

Accolades 
Dug Days fifth episode, "Science", received a nomination for Best Animated Television Production for Children at the 49th Annie Awards. At the 1st Children's and Family Emmy Awards, the series was nominated for Outstanding Directing for an Animated Program, Outstanding Writing for an Animated Program, and Outstanding Editing for an Animated Program (Torbin Xan Bullock).
"Digged" won Best Animation/Family for a TV/Streaming Series at the 2022 Golden Trailer Awards.

References

External links
 

2020s American animated television series
2021 American television series debuts
2021 American television series endings
American children's animated comedy television series
American computer-animated television series
American sequel television series
Animated television series about dogs
Animated television shows based on films
Disney animated television series
Disney+ original programming
English-language television shows
Pixar short films
Television series based on Disney films
Television series by Pixar
Up (2009 film)